Peter Kostic is an Australian drummer best known as a member of Regurgitator and prolific black metal band Nazxul. Kostic joined Regurgitator in 1999 after its original drummer left. He has also been a member of Hard-Ons, Front End Loader, Kryptonics, Dead Boss and Vicious Hairy Mary.

References

Australian drummers
Male drummers
Living people
Australian people of Serbian descent
Year of birth missing (living people)